C̈, c̈ in lower case, also called C with diaeresis, is a letter in the Chechen language. It represents the voiceless postalveolar affricate /t͡ʃ/, like the English pronunciation of ch in the word chocolate. 

The original letter representing the voiceless postalveolar affricate consonant in Chechen was ç, but was changed to c̈ just as ş was changed to s̈.

It is also used in the digraph c̈h in the Yanesha' language; c̈h represents /t͡ʂ/, and ch (without the diaeresis) represents /t͡ʃ/.

Latin letters with diacritics